Vince Dooley was the 22nd head coach of the University of Georgia Bulldogs college football team and served in that role from 1964 to 1988. He compiled a 201–77–10 record (.715 winning percentage).

1964 season 

 Source: 1965 Georgia Bulldogs Football Media Guide/Yearbook

1965 season 

 Source: 1966 Georgia Bulldogs Football Media Guide/Yearbook

1966 season 

 Source: 1967 Georgia Bulldogs Football Media Guide/Yearbook

1967 season 

 Source: 1968 Georgia Bulldogs Football Media Guide/Yearbook

1968 season 

 Source: 1969 Georgia Bulldogs Football Media Guide/Yearbook

1969 season 

 Source: 1970 Georgia Bulldogs Football Media Guide/Yearbook

1970 season 

 Source: 1971 Georgia Bulldogs Football Media Guide/Yearbook

1971 season 

 Source: 1972 Georgia Bulldogs Football Media Guide/Yearbook

1972 season 

 Source: 1973 Georgia Bulldogs Football Media Guide/Yearbook

1973 season 

 Source: 1974 Georgia Bulldogs Football Media Guide/Yearbook

1974 season

1975 season

1976 season

1977 season

1978 season

1979 season

1980 season 

The 1980 Georgia Bulldogs football team completed the season with a 12–0 record. The Bulldogs had a regular season SEC record of 6–0. The Bulldogs completed their season with a victory over Notre Dame in the Sugar Bowl by a score of 17–10, and were crowned the 1980 National Champions

1981 season

1982 season 

The 1982 Bulldogs season would be defined by Herschel Walker's accomplishments. Walker would win the Heisman Trophy, the Maxwell Award, and the Walter Camp Award.

1983 season

1984 season

1985 season

1986 season

1987 season

1988 season

References

Related pages 
 Georgia Bulldogs football
 Southeastern Conference
 University of Georgia

Sources 
  
  
  
  
 

Georgia Bulldogs football seasons
Bulldogs football
Bulldogs football
Bulldogs football